William "Bill" Sandham (10 March 1879 – unknown) was a Welsh rugby union and professional rugby league footballer who played in the 1900s and 1910s. He played club level rugby union (RU) for Neath RFC, and representative level rugby league (RL) for Wales, and at club level for Hull Kingston Rovers, as a forward (prior to the specialist positions of), during the era of contested scrums.

Playing career

International honours
Bill Sandham played as a forward, i.e. number 9, for Wales while at Hull Kingston Rovers in the 5-31 defeat by England at The Watersheddings, Oldham on Saturday 20 January 1912.

Club career
Bill Sandham was Hull Kingston Rovers' second highest try-scorer in the 1910–11 and 1911–12 seasons, and set Hull Kingston Rovers' "most tries in a season by a forward" record with 25-tries scored in the 1912–13 season, this record was extended to 26-tries by Phil Lowe in the 1972–73 season. Bill Sandham was considered a "Probable" for the 1910 Great Britain Lions tour of Australia and New Zealand, but ultimately he was not selected for the tour.

Note
Sandham's fore-initial was stated a being 'A.' on rugbyleagueproject.org.

References

External links
Northern Union → The Colonial Football Tour → Probable Players
Phil Lowe, Hull Kingston Rovers' international second-row forward, scored his 26th try of the season … scoring beat Bill Sandham's 60 year …

Neath RFC players
Hull Kingston Rovers players
Place of birth missing
Place of death missing
Rugby league forwards
Wales national rugby league team players
Welsh rugby league players
Welsh rugby union players
Year of birth missing
Year of death missing